Owen Wynne may refer to:
 Owen Wynne (civil servant) (1652–1700), Welsh civil servant in England
 Owen Wynne (British Army officer) (1665–1737), British general and Irish MP
 Owen Wynne (1687–1756), Irish MP for Sligo Borough from 1713 to 1756
 Owen Wynne (1723–1789), Irish MP for Sligo County 1749–78, for Sligo Borough 1776–89
 Owen Wynne (1755–1841), Irish MP for Sligo Borough from 1790 to 1806 and 1820–30
 Owen Wynne (cricketer) (1919–1975),  South African cricketer who played in 6 Tests from 1948 to 1950